Apiosordaria is a genus of fungi within the Lasiosphaeriaceae family.

References

External links
Apiosordaria at Index Fungorum

Lasiosphaeriaceae